Sem is a former commune in the Ariège department in southwestern France. On 1 January 2019, it was merged into the new commune Val-de-Sos.

Geography and sights
The Sem village lies in the Vicdessos valley at 991 meters above sea level. It is an old mining village, tied with the history of the iron mining of Rancié. The stream of Sem forms a huge waterfall (Carraoucou waterfall) and a cone. A big rock called "the dolmen" of Sem was made by a former glacier.

Population
Inhabitants of Sem are called Sémois.

See also
Communes of the Ariège department

References

Former communes of Ariège (department)
Ariège communes articles needing translation from French Wikipedia
Populated places disestablished in 2019